The Coma Star Cluster (also known as Melotte 111 or Collinder 256) is a small but nearby open cluster located in the constellation Coma Berenices. The cluster contains about 40 brighter stars (between magnitudes 5 and 10) with a common proper motion. The brighter stars of the cluster make out a distinctive "V" shape as seen when Coma Berenices is rising. The cluster used to represent the tail of Leo. However, in around 240 BC, Ptolemy III renamed it for the Egyptian queen Berenice's legendary sacrifice of her hair.

The distance established via the independent analyses agree, thereby making the cluster an important rung on the cosmic distance ladder. The open cluster is roughly twice as distant as the Hyades and covers an area of more than 7.5 degrees on the sky. The cluster is approximately 450 million years old.

See also 
 Alpha Persei Cluster
 List of nearby stellar associations and moving groups

References

External links 
 
 WEBDA page for open cluster Coma Ber by Masaryk University
 SEDS – Melotte 111

Open clusters
Coma Berenices
Astronomical objects known since antiquity